This is the discography of contemporary Christian band For King & Country.

Albums

Studio albums

Live albums

EPs

Singles

As lead artist

As featuring artist

Promotional singles

Other charted songs

Guest appearances

Notes

References

Christian music discographies
Discographies of Australian artists